Sounds Like Life is American country music singer Darryl Worley's fifth studio album. It was released on June 9, 2009 by the Stroudavarious label. The first single "Tequila on Ice" peaked at #44 in 2008, and the second single "Sounds Like Life to Me" became his first Top 40 country hit since "I Just Came Back from a War" in 2007. Worley co-wrote eight of the songs on this album. Sounds Like Life is produced by Jim "Moose" Brown.

Content

"Tequila on Ice"
"Tequila on Ice" was released as the first single from the album. It peaked at #44 on the country charts in mid-2008.

"Sounds Like Life to Me"

Co-written by Worley with Wynn Varble (who has also written several of Worley's other singles) and Phil O'Donnell, "Sounds Like Life to Me" is the album's second single release. It has become Worley's first Top 20 country hit since "I Just Came Back from a War" in late 2006-early 2007.

"Best of Both Worlds"
"Best of Both Worlds" was released as the album's third single in early 2010, written by Worley and Jim "Moose" Brown, and reached a peak of #43 on the country charts in March 2010.

Other songs
Worley wrote the majority of the tracks with his regular co-writers, including Wynn Varble and Don Poythress. The final track, "You Never Know", was written by Jimmy Yeary and Mike McGuire (respectively the lead singer and drummer of country band Shenandoah) about the death of former Shenandoah bass guitarist Ralph Ezell, who died in 2007. Worley said that the song was "dead-on" for him, and thought that its second very closely paralleled the relationship between him and his brother. Track 3, "Slow Dancing with a Memory", was carried over from Worley's last album, 2006's Here and Now.

Critical reception
Stephen Thomas Erlewine of Allmusic rated the album three-and-a-half stars out of five. He considered it an improvement in quality over Worley's albums for DreamWorks Records and thought that the slower-tempo songs such as "Tequila on Ice" worked best. Of those songs, he said, "even if they're cluttered with clichés, they're executed well, emphasizing Worley's low-key charms[.]"

Track listing

Personnel

 Bill Anderson – vocals on track 9
 John Anderson – vocals on track 9
 Kelly Back – electric guitar, baritone guitar
 Jim "Moose" Brown – Producer, acoustic guitar, electric guitar, Hammond B-3 organ, keyboards, piano, electric piano, strings, tambourine, background vocals, Wurlitzer piano
 Pat Buchanan – harmonica
 J.T. Corenflos – electric guitar
 John Cowan – background vocals
 Mark Crum – bass guitar
 Ira Dean – background vocals
 Gilbert Donovan – bass vocals
 Tom Drenon – drums
 Glen Duncan – banjo
 Kevin "Swine" Grantt – bass guitar, background vocals
 Steve Harwell – vocals on track 9
 Larry Hazelbaker – electric guitar, piano, Wurlitzer piano
 Steve Hinson – slide guitar
 Jeff Jared – acoustic guitar, baritone guitar, electric guitar, slide guitar
 Jamey Johnson – vocals on track 9
 Jeff King – 12-string guitar, baritone guitar, electric guitar
 Troy Lancaster – baritone guitar, electric guitar
 B. James Lowry – acoustic guitar
 James Mitchell – electric guitar
 Shaun Murphy – background vocals
 Phil O'Donnell – dobro, acoustic guitar
 Scott Randon – percussion, background vocals
 Steve Sheehan – acoustic guitar
 Chris Stapleton – background vocals
 Mel Tillis – vocals on track 9
 Wynn Varble – background vocals
 Darryl Worley – lead vocals
 Curtis Wright – background vocals

Chart performance

Album

Singles

References

Darryl Worley albums
2009 albums
Albums produced by James Stroud
R&J Records albums